Isaac Aryee (born 1 April 1941) is a Ghanaian boxer. He competed at the 1960 Summer Olympics, the 1962 British Empire and Commonwealth Games, and the 1964 Summer Olympics.

1964 Olympic results

Below is the record of Isaac Aryee, a Ghanaian bantamweight boxer who competed at the 1964 Tokyo Olympics:

 Round of 32: defeated Thein Myint (Burma) by knockout
 Round of 16: lost to Takao Sakuri (Japan) by decision, 0-5

References

1941 births
Living people
Ghanaian male boxers
Olympic boxers of Ghana
Boxers at the 1960 Summer Olympics
Boxers at the 1964 Summer Olympics
Boxers from Accra
Commonwealth Games medallists in boxing
Commonwealth Games silver medallists for Ghana
Boxers at the 1962 British Empire and Commonwealth Games
Flyweight boxers
Medallists at the 1962 British Empire and Commonwealth Games